The Western State Conference (WSC) is a college athletic conference that is affiliated with the California Community College Athletic Association.  The conference was established in 1950, making it the oldest community college conference in California.  Its members are based primarily in the Greater Los Angeles Area, with several spread across neighboring Kern, Santa Barbara, San Bernardino, San Luis Obispo and Ventura counties.

Members 
The league currently has 18 full members:

Venues

Sports offered
 Baseball (men's)
 Basketball (men's and women's)
 Cross Country (men's and women's)
 Football (men's)
 Golf (men's and women's)
 Soccer (men's and women's)
 Softball (women's)
 Swimming & Diving (men's and women's)
 Tennis (men's and women's)
 Track & Field (men's and women's)
 Volleyball (men's and women's)
 Water Polo (men's and women's)

External links
coasports.org
Official website

CCCAA conferences